Vladan Vidaković (born 14 March 1999) is a Serbian professional footballer who plays as a midfielder for Dinamo Batumi, on loan from Maribor.

Club career
Vidaković was a member of the youth academy of Vojvodina. He later played for Voždovac, Radnički Obrenovac and Hajduk 1912, before signing for Spartak Subotica in 2019. Vidaković played 88 games for Spartak in the Serbian SuperLiga, scoring 6 goals.

In July 2022, Vidaković transferred to Maribor for an alleged transfer fee of €450,000 and signed a three-year contract with reigning Slovenian PrvaLiga champions.

International career
In June 2015, Vidaković was a member of the Serbian under-16 national team at the Miljan Miljanić Memorial Tournament. In October of the same year, he also made his competitive debut for the under-17 side in a 1–1 draw against Austria during the 2016 UEFA European Under-17 Championship qualifiers.

Notes

References

External links
Soccerway profile

1999 births
Living people
Footballers from Novi Sad
Serbian footballers
Serbia youth international footballers
Association football midfielders
FK Voždovac players
FK Radnički Obrenovac players
FK Spartak Subotica players
NK Maribor players
FC Dinamo Batumi players
Serbian League players
Serbian SuperLiga players
Slovenian PrvaLiga players

Serbian expatriate footballers
Serbian expatriate sportspeople in Slovenia
Expatriate footballers in Slovenia
Serbian expatriate sportspeople in Georgia (country)
Expatriate footballers in Georgia (country)